Douglas Fonseca (born 28 September 1953) is a Brazilian fencer. He competed in the foil and épée events at the 1988 Summer Olympics.

References

External links
 

1953 births
Living people
Brazilian male épée fencers
Olympic fencers of Brazil
Fencers at the 1988 Summer Olympics
Brazilian male foil fencers
20th-century Brazilian people